Eremophila simulans is a flowering plant in the figwort family, Scrophulariaceae and is endemic to Western Australia. It is an erect shrub with broad, serrated leaves and violet to purple flowers.

Description
Its leaves and branches are sticky and shiny due to the presence of resin. The leaves are elliptic to egg-shaped, hairy along their margins and often on their surfaces although the hairs may be hidden by the coating of resin.

The size and shape of the sepals varies with subspecies. The petal tube is purple or violet on the outside and white with bands of reddish-brown inside the tube. The outside of the petal tube and lobes is hairy, the inside surface of the lobes is glabrous and the inside of the tube is filled with woolly hairs. The 4 stamens are enclosed in the petal tube.

Taxonomy and naming 
The species was first formally described by Robert Chinnock in 2007 and the description was published in Eremophila and Allied Genera: A Monograph of the Plant Family Myoporaceae. The specific epithet (simulans) is a Latin word meaning "imitating" or "copying", referring to the similarity of the features of this species to those of Eremophila georgei.

There are three subspecies:
 Eremophila simulans  Chinnock subsp. simulans which has elliptic to egg-shaped sepals and simple hairs on its branches and leaves;

Distribution and habitat
Subspecies simulans is the most common of the subspecies and occurs on rocky hills and plains between Cue and the Weld Range in the Murchison biogeographic region.

Subspecies lapidensis grows in sandy soils between Sandstone and Meeketharra in the Murchison biogeographic region.

Subspecies megacalyx grows in rocky and sandy clay soil between the Murchison Settlement and Meekatharra in the Murchison biogeographic region.

Conservation
Subspecies simulans and lapidensis are classified as "not threatened" but subspecies megacalyx is classified as "Priority Three" by the Western Australian Government Department of Parks and Wildlife meaning that it is poorly known and known from only a few locations but is not under imminent threat.

Use in horticulture
This eremophila has only recently been introduced into gardens and details about its horticulture are not well known. It has been propagated by grafting onto Myoporum rootstock and grows well in free-draining soil in full sun or part shade. It appears to be drought tolerant but its response to frost is not known.

References

simulans
Eudicots of Western Australia
Endemic flora of Western Australia
Plants described in 2007
Taxa named by Robert Chinnock